Everton Stadium at Bramley-Moore Dock is an under construction football stadium that will become the home ground for Everton F.C. Located on Bramley-Moore Dock in Vauxhall, Liverpool, England, it is due to open for the start of the 2024–25 season, replacing Goodison Park.

Bramley-Moore is a former commercial dock that sits behind locked gates next to a wastewater treatment plant, and it is intended that the new stadium will become the heart of a new mixed-use development in the area containing shops, housing and other venues.

Planning

Everton first played at Goodison Park in 1892 and has been gradually updated since its construction, the most recent major development being the opening of a new stand in August 1994, which has given it an all-seater capacity of more than 40,000, but ultimately is constrained by its methods of construction and its location. In 2007, then-CEO Keith Wyness revealed that the club had spent £500,000 on repairs just to keep the steelwork of the ground up to standard, and that within ten years there was a serious possibility it may not pass safety inspections. The Taylor Report in 1990 required that all stadia in the Football League in Britain become all-seater, which severely curtailed Goodison Park's capacity, which had peaked at more than 78,000, to just over 40,000, and then further to its current capacity of 39,414. This lags behind nearby Anfield, which has plans to expand to 62,000, but still being much lower capacity than Old Trafford and various other stadia.

The possibility of a move to a new stadium was first mentioned around 1996, when then chairman Peter Johnson announced plans to move Everton from Goodison Park to a new 60,000-seater stadium at a different site. By 2001, a site at King's Dock had been identified as the location for a new 55,000-seater stadium, scheduled for completion around 2005, but these plans were abandoned due to funding difficulties.

Everton entered into talks with the Knowsley Council and Tesco in June 2006 over the possibility of building a new 55,000-seat stadium, expandable to over 60,000, in Kirkby. The plan became known as The Kirkby Project. The club took the unusual move of giving its supporters a say in the club's future by holding a ballot on the proposal with the results being in favour of it, 59% to 41%. Opponents to the plan included other local councils concerned by the effect of a large Tesco store being built as part of the development and a group of fans demanding that Everton should remain within the city boundaries of Liverpool. Following a public inquiry into the project, the central government rejected the proposal. Local and regional politicians attempted to put together an amended rescue plan with the Liverpool City Council calling a meeting with Everton F.C. The plan was to assess some suitable sites short listed within the city boundary. However, the amended plan was also not successful.

Everton enquired into the possibility of co-financing Liverpool F.C's Stanley Park Stadium, a proposed stadium plan that was scheduled to open in 2006 but was cancelled in 2012 after new owners favoured the expansion of Anfield. This idea was denied by Liverpool's former co-owner Tom Hicks. There was speculation at the time for a joint stadium project between the two clubs but despite these rumours, Liverpool maintained that a ground sharing situation was never on the agenda.

The Liverpool City Council Regeneration and Transport Select Committee meeting on 10 February 2011 featured a proposal to open the Bootle Branch line using "Liverpool Football Club and Everton Football Club as priorities, as economic enablers of the project". This proposal would place both football clubs on a rapid transit Merseyrail line that would circle the city and ease transport access. In September 2014 the club, working with the Liverpool City Council and Liverpool Mutual Homes, outlined initial plans to build a new stadium in Walton Hall Park. However, those plans were later scrapped in May 2016 with the prospect of two new sites being identified for the club. At the Annual General Meeting in January 2017, the chairman, Bill Kenwright revealed that Bramley-Moore Dock was the preferred site for the new stadium, with a new railway station and a new road being funded by the City Council. This was contingent on setting up a Special Purpose Vehicle with Liverpool council, who would act as guarantors for the hundreds of millions in commercial loans the club planned to use to finance the construction.

The choice of the Bramley-Moore Dock site was endorsed in a public consultation exercise conducted in 2018, but was met with stern criticism from UNESCO, which later removed Liverpool from World Heritage Sites. Architect Dan Meis has been charged with designing a new stadium for Everton, followed by a second stage of consultation, called The People's Project.

In November 2017, the club agreed to a lease with Peel Holdings lasting 200 years, and in 2018 revealed its plans for a 52,000 seat stadium, which could be expanded to 62,000 in the future, demand permitting.

Funding

On 23 March 2017, it was announced that a deal had been agreed between Liverpool City Council, Everton F.C., and Peel Holdings to acquire the dock for a new football stadium.

On 31 March 2017, Liverpool City Council voted in favour of creating a Special Purpose Vehicle company. The company was proposed with securing the funds for the stadium. The lenders would acquire a 200-year head-lease of the land from Peel, the landowners, and leasing the stadium to the SPV, which would in turn sub-lease to Everton for 40 years.

The current funding model now proposed before Liverpool City Council (revealed at Everton's AGM on 9 January 2018)  would be an arrangement that will see the council borrow £280m at ultra-low interest rates from the government, and then pass that loan on to the club at a profit to the city of around £7m a year over 25 years. Costs for the new stadium now escalating to an estimated £500m, would mean the club would still require to find the remaining £220m. As of June 2018 the council funding was still not in place, and doubts were raised by Mayor Anderson if this funding model would be agreed.

In July 2019, it was reported that the Club had options to fund the development from both the private and public sectors, which could include selling naming rights to a sponsor.

In January 2020, it was announced that Everton have agreed a naming right deal worth £30 million with USM who already sponsors Everton's training ground, Finch Farm.
 
The club further announced that it would enlist the help of major international banks JP Morgan and MUFG to help secure finance for the new stadium.

In March 2022, Everton announced they would no longer receive a loan from Liverpool City council and had acquired alternative funding.

Proposed features 

Everton's proposed new stadium is a bowl design with a proposed capacity of 52,888 and constructed of steel and glass, with the current dock being filled with reclaimed sand from the River Mersey.

Similar to the Tottenham Hotspur Stadium, it is intended that there will be a 13,000-seater stand which is reportedly inspired by the "Yellow Wall" at the Westfalenstadion, the stadium of Borussia Dortmund.

The stadium will feature an experience  named 'ALL', designed to offer a wide choice of social spaces from pubs and bars and high-street style restaurants through to personal and fine-dining experiences.

Loss of Liverpool Maritime Mercantile City UNESCO World Heritage Status

Bramley-Moore Dock was within the Liverpool Maritime Mercantile City, UNESCO World Heritage Site and has a number of heritage assets that are at risk or in disrepair, which Everton F.C. stated will be repaired and maintained.

Despite this, in 2021, UNESCO recommended that the City lose its status, with the development at Bramley-Moore Dock being one of the reasons, along with the longstanding development of the waterfront and the wider Liverpool Waters project. The heritage body said the stadium "would have a completely unacceptable major adverse impact on the authenticity, integrity and outstanding universal value of the World Heritage Site." The revocation of the world heritage site status was confirmed in July 2021.

References

Everton F.C.
Proposed buildings and structures in Liverpool
Proposed football venues in England